Tom Wall may refer to:

 Tom Wall (artist) (1941–1992), British landscape painter and educator
 Tom Wall (hurler) (1914–2005), Irish hurler
 Tom Wall (guitarist), American singer-songwriter, musician and activist

See also
 Thomas Wall (disambiguation)